is a Japanese freestyle wrestler.

Wrestling career
She competes in the 48 kg division and won the silver medal in the same division at the 2012 World Wrestling Championships. Her performance improved in the 2013 World Wrestling Championships where she won the gold medal after defeating Mayelis Caripá of Venezuela. She won the 2016 Rio Olympic gold medal for Women's 48 kg freestyle wrestling by 3-2 decision over Mariya Stadnik of Azerbaijan. She was trailing by a point till very late. She was successful to convert a take down with two seconds remaining on the clock to win the gold medal bout.

Personal life
Tosaka is married to Kazuma Kuramoto, a Japanese mixed martial artist.

Championships and accomplishments
 Tokyo Sports
 Wrestling Special Award (2013, 2014, 2015, 2016)

References

External links
 
 

1993 births
Living people
Japanese female sport wrestlers
Olympic wrestlers of Japan
Wrestlers at the 2016 Summer Olympics
Olympic gold medalists for Japan
Olympic medalists in wrestling
Medalists at the 2016 Summer Olympics
World Wrestling Championships medalists
Wrestlers at the 2014 Asian Games
Asian Games medalists in wrestling
Asian Games gold medalists for Japan
Universiade medalists in wrestling
Medalists at the 2014 Asian Games
Universiade gold medalists for Japan
Medalists at the 2013 Summer Universiade
Shigakkan University alumni
Asian Wrestling Championships medalists
21st-century Japanese women